Arthur Harold Moss (November 1889 in Greenwich Village – February 20, 1969 in Neuilly-sur-Marne) was an American expatriate poet and magazine editor.

Life
His parents were Polish-Jewish immigrants.  After serving in World War I, he attended Cornell University for three years, but dropped out.

The Quill
In 1917, he returned to Greenwich Village, founding The Quill with partner Harold Hersey and was managing editor and wrote articles.  It included artists Clara Tice, Wood Gaylor, Mark Tobey and Alfred J Frueh; writers included Ben De Casseres.

He married Millia Davenport (1895–1992) and worked with her at The Quill. They co-authored, The Quill: For And By Greenwich Village, vol.4, no.8, 1919. They separated shortly thereafter. She went on to design costumes, and in 1948 wrote The Book of Costume.  
In 1920, he hired his future wife Florence Gilliam to edit Quill.  In 1921 they moved to Paris, into a small apartment near Shakespeare and Company, the bookstore owned by Sylvia Beach.

Gargoyle
In August 1921, they began publishing Gargoyle, an intense literary magazine.  Gargoyle published reproductions of Henri Matisse, Pablo Picasso, André Derain, Amedeo Modigliani, Paul Cézanne.  Writers contributing to the publication included Ezra Pound, Robert Coates, Malcolm Cowley, Hart Crane, Stephen Vincent Benét, Hilda Doolittle, Edna St. Vincent Millay, and Sinclair Lewis.  Without outside backing and lacking a subscriber base, in October 1922, Gargoyle ceased publication. For the next few years Arthur would write a column for The New York Times and the Paris Herald.

Hemingway
Ernest Hemingway and his wife moved to Paris in December 1921. He loved books and frequented Shakespeare and Company where he met Moss, who convinced Hemingway to submit articles to Gargoyle. These early writings drew the attention of Robert McAlmon. The original writings are now in the JFK Library.

Boulevardier
In 1927 Arthur began publishing Boulevardier with Erskine Gwynne. Patterned after The New Yorker, one of the regular illustrators was Raymond Peynet. Contributors included Michael Arlen, Noël Coward, Louis Bromfield, Sinclair Lewis and Ernest Hemingway.

Moss and Gilliam divorced in 1931.  By 1932 he married Evalyn Marvel.  He was survived by his widow Doreen Vidal.

Works

Non-fiction
"The Turkish Myth", The Nation, Arthur Moss & Florence Gilliam, June 23, 1923

Editor

References

External links
"Author Moss", The Lost Generation
Contemporary Authors Online, Gale, 2009. Farmington Hills, Mich.: Gale, 2009

1889 births
1969 deaths
American male poets
American expatriates in France
American magazine editors
Cornell University alumni
20th-century American poets
20th-century American male writers
20th-century American non-fiction writers
American male non-fiction writers